Bull Hill is a mountain in Schoharie County, New York. It is located east of Gilboa. Reed Hill is located northwest and Stevens Mountain is located southwest of Bull  Hill.

References

Mountains of Schoharie County, New York
Mountains of New York (state)